Bill Hagerty (born 23 April 1939) is a British former newspaper editor, now chairman emeritus of British Journalism Review.

Born in Ilford, Hagerty attended Beal Grammar School, where he developed an interest in journalism, although his headteacher was dismissive of the idea. Despite this, he entered journalism with local newspapers before joining Reynolds News, soon to become the Sunday Citizen, in 1962. He then moved to the Daily Sketch and then Mirror group, where he worked for many years that included spells as Assistant Editor of the Daily Mirror, Sunday Mirror and The People.

Hagerty left the Mirror group in 1985, joining Today, serving as managing editor and, from 1987, editor of Sunday Today. He returned to "Mirror" group to become deputy editor of the Sunday Mirror in 1988, then deputy editor and subsequently acting editor of the Daily Mirror in 1990, before becoming editor of The People the following year. This last move was a surprise to Hagerty, who had believed that, already in his fifties, he would not be appointed to the editorship of a major national newspaper.

In 1992, following the death of proprietor Robert Maxwell, Hagerty was among many journalists in the company sacked from their editorial posts and took a variety of positions, including theatre and film critic for Today, and subsequently other publications before becoming theatre critic of The Sun. He was appointed editor of British Journalism Review in 2002, and Chairman of the journal a decade later.

Hagerty was interviewed by National Life Stories (C638/13) in 2007 for the 'Oral History of the British Press' collection held by the British Library.

In 2011/12 he was chairman of the Journalists’ Charity, of which he remains a trustee, and is a director of the London Press Club. He edited eight volumes of Alastair Campbell's diaries for publication. and wrote a centenary history of the Daily Mirror, Read All About It. He is married to the journalist Liz Vercoe.

References
Who's Who entry
Read All About It (First Stone Publishing, 2003) 

1939 births
Living people
British newspaper editors
People from Ilford